I Eat Your Skin (also known as Zombies, Zombie Bloodbath and Voodoo Blood Bath) is a 1971 American horror film written, produced and directed by Del Tenney. It stars William Joyce, Heather Hewitt and Walter Coy. The film was shot entirely in Florida in 1964 under the title Caribbean Adventure to disguise from potential investors the fact that it was a zombie film.

The film failed to find a distributor and was shelved until 1971, when distributor Jerry Gross bought it and retitled it to form the exploitational-sounding double feature I Drink Your Blood and I Eat Your Skin. The film follows the adventures of a playboy novelist who travels to Voodoo Island in the Caribbean to research a new book. While there he unexpectedly encounters a voodoo cult, whose leader intends to take over the world with an army of zombies.

Plot 

Adventure novelist and playboy Tom Harris is sent from Miami Beach to remote Voodoo Island in the Caribbean to gather material for a new book. Harris's publisher Duncan Fairchild and Fairchild's wife Coral accompany him. As they near the island, their small airplane runs out of fuel. Tom takes the controls from pilot Enrico and lands perfectly on a narrow beach.

Tom sets out alone for a house he spotted from the air. On the way he stops to watch a young blonde woman swim naked in a jungle pond. Suddenly a tall zombie appears. Tom yells to warn her. He dives in and swims toward the zombie as she swims in the opposite direction. But Tom can't find the zombie. He asks a fisherman for help. The zombie, wielding a machete, attacks them and decapitates the fisherman. Tom fires four bullets into him to no effect. The zombie runs away when armed men arrive in a Jeep.

The leader of the men introduces himself as Charles Bentley. When Tom asks him about zombies, Charles says there are none and that the islanders are "a very simple people" who cannot comprehend that a man could be "deranged of mind, a homicidal maniac."

Back at the plane, Duncan, Coral and Enrico are frightened by islanders who are approaching in a threatening manner. Tom and Charles arrive. Charles orders the islanders to secure the plane. He introduces himself to Duncan as the overseer of Voodoo Island, which is owned by the never-seen Lord Carrington. They go to Charles's house.

As Coral and Duncan admire the tropical sunset, Tom warns them that not all is as lovely as it seems. He asks the housekeeper about voodoo drums and human sacrifice, but she is a member of the voodoo cult and feigns ignorance.

Before dinner that night, Tom meets the woman he saw swimming. She is Janine Biladeau, the daughter of scientist Dr. Augustus Biladeau. As the others gather, Tom tells them of the zombie attack and says "I heard a rumor there's an army of walking dead on this island." Augustus immediately dismisses the notion, saying that the islanders use a plant-based narcotic that can cause physical and mental problems.

Tom and Janine go for a walk in the moonlight. Zombies attack them and carry off Janine. Tom rescues her and escorts her back to the house. Privately, Charles tells Tom that Janine is at risk of being sacrificed because she is a blonde virgin. Janine and Tom fall into bed. Tom asks her to leave the island with him and the others the next day, but she refuses because she will not leave her father behind. Meanwhile, the cult performs a ceremony presided over by the masked Papa Neybo.

The next morning, Tom tells Duncan to gather everyone at the plane so that they can leave. Janine has decided to go with them and to ask Augustus to leave as well. She takes Tom to Augustus's lab, but before they can enter, her friend Fernando warns them that Janine will be kidnapped and sacrificed that night.

Augustus is in his lab experimenting with irradiated snake venom, which he hopes will cure cancer. He injects a man with it and the man immediately transforms into a zombie. Augustus asks Tom to take Janine away, but says that it is too late for him to leave. Zombies attack the lab. Janine and Tom flee toward the beach.

Tom, Duncan and Enrico manhandle the plane into the proper orientation for take-off. But zombies grab Janine and Coral. As Enrico starts the plane's engine, the tall zombie walks into its spinning propeller carrying a box of explosives. The resulting blast kills Enrico and destroys both airplane and zombie. Tom and Duncan dive into the sea to escape the zombies pursuing them.

Duncan and Tom swim until they find a motorboat. They then disguise themselves as voodoo cultists and go to the ceremony to save Janine. Unknown to them, however, Augustus is watching. Just as Papa Neybo is about to behead Janine, Augustus throws a knife, killing Papa Neybo and revealing him to be Charles.

Tom, Janine, Coral, Duncan and Augustus race back to the lab, the cultists and zombies giving chase. Augustus rigs his equipment so that it will blow up and destroy Voodoo Island, ending, he says, Charles's "insane" plan to take over the world with his army of indestructible zombies.

As they escape in the boat, two cultists clamber aboard. Augustus is stabbed in the back before both cultists are killed. Dying, Augustus explains that the zombies are the accidental result of his experiments and when Charles discovered this, he hatched his scheme for world conquest. Augustus dies, the island explodes and the others sail back to Miami Beach.

Cast 
 William Joyce as Tom Harris
 Heather Hewitt as Janine Biladeau
Walter Coy as Charles Bentley
 Dan Stapleton as Duncan Fairchild
Betty Hyatt Linton as Coral Fairchild
Robert Stanton as Dr. Augustus Biladeau
 Vanoye Aikens
Rebecca Oliver
Matthew King
George-Ann Williamson
Don Strawn's Calypso Band

Production 
I Eat Your Skin was made by Del Tenney Productions. It is a regional film, defined by regional horror film specialist Brian Albright as one that is "(a) filmed outside of the general professional and geographic confines of Hollywood; (b) produced independently; and (c) made with a cast and crew made up primarily of residents of the states in which the film was shot." Although set on an island in the Caribbean, the movie was filmed in Miami Beach and Key Biscayne, Florida.

Academic film critic Peter Dendle notes several problems that point to the production phase of I Eat Your Skin. He writes that "All aspects of writing, staging, and dialog are hopelessly contrived." And as to the zombies themselves, he says that "The make-up effect consists of a coating of plaster over the face and neck (which apparently doesn't reflect decomposition, since it appears so quickly" and quotes James O'Neill as referring to them in his book Terror on Tape as "bug-eyed, crud-faced zombies".

Tenney's original intent was to release the film - then known as Zombies - on a double feature with Frankenstein Meets the Space Monster. I Eat Your Skin was produced on a $120,000 budget, but did not find a distributor and sat unreleased for six years. Tenney eventually sold the film to Gross for $40,000. Film critic and psychometrist Bryan Senn notes that "Even in 1964, shooting a horror film in black-and-white and expecting to find a decent distributor was an act of pure optimism." Senn adds that, when Tenney was asked in an interview what he thought of I Eat Your Skin, he "laughingly admitted, 'I didn't like it very much; I thought it was sort of silly.'"

In another interview, Tenney said that the film was shot in three weeks, not his "usual" two weeks because Twentieth Century Fox required him to use a union production crew. If he did not, he said, the company would not distribute the movie. Tenney felt that the union members were "slow and uncooperative." He also said that delays were caused by a hurricane and by members of the cast and crew needing medical treatment for snakebites and illnesses contracted in the Florida swamps during filming.

I Eat Your Skin was given a "parental warning" ratings by two organizations: a GP rating by the Motion Picture Association of America (MPAA), and an A-III rating by the Catholic News Service.

Distribution 
I Eat Your Skin premiered in Los Angeles on May 5, 1971. It was distributed by Cinemation Industries to drive-in theatres with I Drink Your Blood on a "mandatory" double feature; i.e., theatre owners were required to show both films as a double feature.

I Eat Your Skin has had a long life on television and in revival theatres.

On TV, Elvira's Movie Macabre aired the film twice, the first time in 1981 when the program was still a local show in Los Angeles and again in 2011 when the program was in nationwide syndication. It was also shown on Temple University TV in July 2016 as part of the Saturday Night Fright Special. And the non-profit Arroyo Channel in Pasadena, California ran the film in July 2018 on its Horror Host Theatre-Bordello of Horror program.

Recent theatrical screenings include the Mahoney Drive-In in Lehighton, Pennsylvania in October 2015 and Quentin Tarantino's New Beverley Cinema in Los Angeles in January 2017. It was also screened as part of the Majestic Science Theatre 3000 film series at the Majestic Theatre in Corvallis, Oregon in October 2018.

Reception 
A complaint made by reviewers is that despite the title I Eat Your Skin, no skin is eaten during the film.

British film critic Phil Hardy has little to say about the film, good or bad. He notes that after failing to be distributed "for seven years," it was "put on a double-feature programme advertised as 'Two great blood horrors to rip out your guts.'"

In The Zombie Movie Encyclopedia, Dendle writes "Never mind the title - this is as mild as horror gets." But he goes on to say that even I Eat Your Skin has its good moments. For example, "In an anomalously creative scene, a zombie blows up the protagonists' plane by casually walking into the propeller while holding a box of explosives - a zombie suicide bomber."

A review by Senn is also mixed. He writes that "Compared to the mean-spirited I Drink Your Blood, Tenney's co-feature is downright enjoyable" with zombies that "provide a few genuine shudders, and so fulfill the first rule of zombie cinema - that dead people should be scary." But he finds little good to say about the film's technical aspects. He calls the jazz score "intrusive and quite often inappropriate," says the movie is "flatly photographed and poorly lit" and opines that I Eat Your Skin "plays just below the competency level. Most scenes had to be overdubbed, and the poor-quality sound and (mis)matching show."

Critic Glenn Kay damns the film with faint praise. After noting the "bad effects, horrible dialogue, and a Muzak-inspired score," he calls the movie "a goofball flick" and a "concoction [that] is fascinating, and like so many other films of the 1960s, it's almost entertaining in a so-bad-it's-good way."

British critic Jamie Russell's review is a bit harsher. He writes that I Eat Your Skin is a "laughable voodoo-esque tale" with "woeful zombies" that was "shelved for reasons obvious to anyone who has had the misfortune of sitting through it." But he points out the film's historical place as part of the "bumper crop" of post-Night of the Living Dead movies, although adding that most of these movies "have slid into (mostly) deserved obscurity."

BoxOffice magazine thought little of the film at the time of its release, calling it "as old-fashioned as any B picture made in the Forties" and noting that "There is very little anyone could find remotely objectionable here, even a 'nude' swim scene being made an obvious cover-up." It rated I Eat Your Skin as "fair" on its five-point very- poor-to-very-good scale, with The New York Daily News calling it "very poor."

In a review of the eight-film DVD box set Mad Monster Rally, David Cornelius of DVD Talk writes that "The film (...) went undistributed for six long years, and one look explains why: it's an utterly square attempt at early-60s hipness with a jazzy score and a hero (...) who fancies himself a [Sean Connery]-era James Bond, surrounding himself with platinum blondes." Cornelius goes on to say that "Tenney pads the picture with a couple exploitation scenes of witch doctor rituals, and we fall asleep".

Paul Pritchard of DVD Verdict simply calls I Eat Your Skin "just the type of cheap crap that sullies the good name of exploitation cinema."

References in popular culture
A drive-in theater sign in the 2018 film The Other Side of the Wind advertises the double feature of I Drink Your Blood and I Eat Your Skin.

See also
 List of American films of 1964

References

External links
 
 

1964 films
1964 horror films
American exploitation films
American supernatural horror films
American black-and-white films
American zombie films
Films set in Coral Gables, Florida
Films shot in Florida
Films about Voodoo
Films set in the Caribbean
1970s English-language films
1960s English-language films
Films directed by Del Tenney
1960s American films
1970s American films